Hickman Matthew Snorton (February 26, 1942 – December 30, 2016) was an American football player.  He played for the Michigan State University Spartans football team from 1961 to 1963. He was drafted by the Detroit Lions in the second round of the 1964 NFL Draft, but opted instead to play professional football in the AFL for the Denver Broncos, appearing in five games during the 1964 season. He later became the emergency manager for Christian County, Kentucky.

Snorton died on December 30, 2016, at the age of 74.

References

1942 births
2016 deaths
American football tight ends
Michigan State Spartans football players
Denver Broncos (AFL) players
Players of American football from Kentucky
People from Christian County, Kentucky